Olivier Lalliet is a French slalom canoeist who competed in the 2000s. He won a gold medal in the C1 team event at the 2005 ICF Canoe Slalom World Championships in Penrith.

World Cup individual podiums

References

French male canoeists
Living people
Year of birth missing (living people)
Medalists at the ICF Canoe Slalom World Championships
21st-century French people